Andrea Weigand (born 1977) is a Canadian international lawn bowler.

She won a silver medal in the fours with Shirley Fitzpatrick-Wong, Melissa Ranger and Anita Nivala at the 1998 Commonwealth Games in Kuala Lumpur. 

Weigand is also a former Canadian National fours champion.

References

Living people
1977 births
Bowls players at the 2002 Commonwealth Games
Canadian female bowls players
Commonwealth Games medallists in lawn bowls
Commonwealth Games silver medallists for Canada
Medallists at the 2002 Commonwealth Games